The Alabama sturgeon (Scaphirhynchus suttkusi) is a species of sturgeon native to the United States of America and now only believed to exist in  of the lower Alabama River. Biologists have known of the fish since the 1950s or 1960s, but the large diversity of aquatic species in Alabama prevented formal identification until 1991.

Protected status controversy
The Alabama sturgeon was first proposed for protected status in the early 1990s, although by then the fish was already so rare its survival was uncertain.  The sturgeon's protection was opposed by a variety of industries located along Alabama's rivers for the feared economic impact.  The opponents' main arguments were that it was already extinct or that it was not a distinct species.  In response to this opposition, the U.S. Fish and Wildlife Service ceased efforts to place the fish on the Endangered Species List.  Then Ray Vaughan, an environmental lawyer in Montgomery, Alabama, sued the Service and, in 2000, won, requiring Fish and Wildlife to list the fish for protection.

Recent efforts
In 1993, state and federal biologists began a program to help save the Alabama sturgeon through a captive breeding program.  Unfortunately, only six fish have been captured since then, all male.  The last fish held in captivity died in 2002.  The most recent specimen was captured in April 2007.  After determining the fish was a male, sperm were collected, a small tracking device implanted, and it was released once it had fully healed.
  It was hoped that the tagged fish would lead to others of its species, but in a year of tracking to date, this has not happened.

Although the rivers are dammed at multiple locations, management of the river flows is expected to continue unchanged. In July 2009, fish researchers lost contact with the only known live Alabama sturgeon. The fish had been given an electronic tracking device in hopes that the fish would lead them to other members of the species, but the device stopped working.

In August 2013, the Fish and Wildlife Service released the "Recovery Plan for the Alabama Sturgeon (Scaphirhynchus suttkusi)". It includes a plan to establish a captive stock that can produce fingerlings to be released back into the wild and to improve the habitat in the Alabama River through operational changes at Claiborne and Millers Ferry Lock and Dams.

Studies from 2014 and 2015 indicated that despite the very few sightings over the last decade, the species is still extant. This is due to numerous traces of recent Alabama sturgeon DNA (environmental DNA) found in water samples gathered from the river.

References

External links
 Alabama sturgeon page  of the U.S. Fish and Wildlife Service's Endangered Species Program site
 Alabama Sturgeon of the Mobile basin at the Alabama Department of Conservation and Natural Resources
 WKRG News 5 - Scientists lose contact with lone Alabama sturgeon via the Internet Archive Wayback machine
 
 

Scaphirhynchus
Freshwater fish of the United States
Endemic fauna of Alabama
Fish of the Eastern United States
Critically endangered fish
Critically endangered fauna of the United States
Fish described in 1991
ESA endangered species